Caleb E. Nelson (born September 15, 1966) is the Emerson G. Spies Distinguished Professor of Law at the University of Virginia School of Law.

Early life and education 

Nelson is the son of David Aldrich Nelson, a former judge on the United States Court of Appeals for the Sixth Circuit, and Mary Nelson. He graduated magna cum laude and Phi Beta Kappa from Harvard University in 1988 with an A.B. in mathematics, where he was editor-in-chief of the Salient. Nelson then moved to Washington, D.C. where he served as the managing editor of The Public Interest, a domestic-policy quarterly. In 1993, he graduated from Yale Law School.

Career 

After graduating from Yale, Nelson clerked for Judge Stephen F. Williams of the United States Court of Appeals for the District of Columbia Circuit and then for Justice Clarence Thomas of the Supreme Court of the United States. Nelson then spent three years as a litigation associate at the firm Taft Stettinius & Hollister in Cincinnati. In 1998, Nelson joined the law faculty at the University of Virginia. As a professor, Nelson focuses his teaching and research on federal courts, constitutional law, legislation, and civil procedure. Nelson is the author of the highly cited article "Preemption," which appeared in the March 2000 issue of the Virginia Law Review.

Important publications 

.
.
.
.
.
.
.
.

Awards and honors 

 Winner of the Scholarly Papers Competition, Association of American Law Schools (2000)
 Paul M. Bator Award, the Federalist Society (2006)
 University of Virginia McFarland Award (2006)
 University of Virginia All-University Teaching Award (2008)

See also 
 List of law clerks of the Supreme Court of the United States (Seat 10)

References

External links
 2013 Charge to the Class with Professor Caleb Nelson (video 16:13 mins). University of Virginia School of Law. YouTube.
 Professor Caleb Nelson: "The Relation Between Legislative Intent and Statutory Meaning" (video 42:01 mins). University of Virginia School of Law. YouTube.

1966 births
Federalist Society members
Harvard University alumni
Law clerks of the Supreme Court of the United States
Living people
People from Cincinnati
University of Virginia School of Law faculty
American scholars of constitutional law
Yale Law School alumni